The 1978 Baylor Bears football team represented the Baylor University in the 1978 NCAA Division I-A football season.  The Bears finished the season sixth in the Southwest Conference. Sophomore Mike Singletary established a team record with 232 tackles in 1978, including 34 in a game against the University of Houston.

Schedule

Team Players drafted into the NFL
The following players were drafted into professional football following the season.

References

Baylor
Baylor Bears football seasons
Baylor Bears football